Austin J. "Ozzie" Yue (born 12 August 1947) is a British actor and musician of Chinese heritage. His television roles include appearances in Father Ted, All Quiet on the Preston Front and Coronation Street  and roles in films include Lara Croft: Tomb Raider, Syriana and Nuns on the Run. In the 1960s Yue was guitarist with Merseybeat group the Hideaways and later for the 1970s group Supercharge.  He now has own band, "Yue Who", and in 2008 starred in the title role in Kensuke's Kingdom, a theatre production which has toured the UK.

Early life and education
Yue was born in Liverpool, Lancashire. His father, Jack, was a restaurateur, court translator and point of contact between Liverpool's Chinese and English communities.
Ozzie went to junior schools in the Wirral and Skerry's School in Rodney Street, Liverpool. He then attended the Liverpool Institute High School for Boys as a contemporary of Paul McCartney and George Harrison, although junior to them. Yue has admitted that he did "flick pieces of paper" at McCartney during art classes.

Musical career
After a spell as an apprentice electrician, Yue joined the Hideaways as guitarist during the Merseybeat era; he played at the Cavern Club more often than the Beatles. In the 1970s, he joined funk, soul & RnB group Supercharge, which achieved some reputation and local success, but failed to make an impression on the UK charts. They did however have a number 1 single in Australia in 1976. In the late 1970s he played with Liverpool band "Joker". Today Yue has his own RnB group playing locally, "Yue Who".

Acting career
In his teens, Yue appeared in productions such as The King and I and South Pacific at the Royal Court Theatre, Liverpool. However, acting took a back seat during his musical career until the 1980s, when he began to be cast in British film and television, usually in stereotypical Chinese roles such as waiters and minor villains. He was initially offered work by Granada TV as an extra, and of this he says,  From the early 1990s onwards, Yue has appeared in numerous productions and in 2006 branched out into theatre, starring in Kensuke's Kingdom across the country and finally at London's Bloomsbury Theatre. In March/April 2015 he returned to the Liverpool stage playing the roles of Snug and Mustardseed in the Everyman Theatre production of A Midsummer Night's Dream.

In 2013, he played "Taxi Driver" in the BBC comedy-drama Being Eileen.

Selected appearances

Television
 1990 Agatha Christie's Poirot - Restaurant Manager
 1990 London's Burning - Chinese Man
 1992 Lovejoy - 'Flat Fee' Lee Chan
 1992 To Be the Best - Bank President
 1993 The Long Roads - Jimmy
 1994 All Quiet on the Preston Front - Peter Wang
 1994 The House of Windsor - Mr. Takasoni
 1995 Porkpie - Mr Lu
 1995 Harry - Tommy
 1996 Porkpie - Mr Lu
 1996 Thief Takers - Uncle Wong
 1998 Father Ted - Sean Yin
 1998 Dinnerladies - Malcolm
 2004 Silent Witness - Micky Choo
 2005 Meet the Magoons - Scouse Punter
 2005 
 2005 Rocket Man - Mr. Xi
 2011 Come Fly With Me - Chinese Man
 2011 White Van Man - Mr. Chung
 2012 Doctor Who - Foreman
 2013 Being Eileen - "Taxi Driver"

Film
 1990 Nuns on the Run - Ernie Wong
 1998 Croupier - Mr Tchai
 2001 Lara Croft: Tomb Raider - Aged Buddhist Monk
 2003 Out for a Kill - Fang 'The Barber' Lee
 2005 Syriana - Chinese Oil Executive
 2008 Act of Grace - Dai-Lo

References

External links
 
 Ozzie Yue Interview NAMM Oral History Library (2019)

1947 births
English male film actors
English male television actors
British male actors of Chinese descent
Living people
Male actors from Liverpool
Musicians from Liverpool
English people of Chinese descent